The Chatham-Kent municipal election, 2006 took place on November 13, 2006, to elect a mayor, regional councillors and city councillors in the city of Chatham-Kent, Ontario, Canada. It was held in conjunction with all other municipalities in Ontario.

Results

Mayoral race

Municipal council

2006 Ontario municipal elections
Chatham-Kent